Martha, Ruth and Edie is a Canadian drama film, released in 1988. An anthology film directed by Deepa Mehta, Norma Bailey and Danielle J. Suissa, the film centres on the titular Martha (Jennifer Dale), Ruth (Andrea Martin) and Edie (Lois Maxwell), who meet after being locked out of the auditorium at a personal development seminar, and instead share personal stories from their own lives among themselves. Each of their stories is a dramatization of a short story by a Canadian writer, and is directed by one of the three credited directors.

"How I Met My Husband", directed by Bailey from the short story by Alice Munro, depicts how Edie's brief teenage romantic fling with a visiting pilot, followed by her persistent but unfulfilled hope that he will write her letters after he leaves, ultimately leads to her meeting and marrying the mailman. (Edie is played by Margaret Langrick in the flashback.) "California Aunts", directed by Mehta from the story by Cynthia Flood, depicts the transformation of Ruth's life as a smalltown librarian after her mother dies and her aunts come to stay with her. "Guilt", directed by Suissa from the story by Betty Lambert, depicts Martha taking a new job teaching English in a prison after her husband leaves her for another woman.

The film's supporting cast includes Helen Hughes, Tom Jackson, Frank Moore, Chuck Shamata, Tom Butler and Kate Trotter. Hughes received a Genie Award nomination for Best Supporting Actress at the 10th Genie Awards in 1989.

References

External links
 

1988 drama films
1988 films
Canadian anthology films
Canadian drama films
English-language Canadian films
Fictional trios
Films directed by Deepa Mehta
Films directed by Norma Bailey
Films based on short fiction
Films based on works by Alice Munro
1980s English-language films
1980s Canadian films